Sport on Friday was a BBC television sports programme that ran from 1987 until 1997. It was broadcast during the winter months - October until April - and was a companion show to both Sportsnight and Grandstand.

The programme began the previous year as Sports Afternoon and was part of the BBC's newly launched daytime service. Sports Afternoon was broadcast on Wednesday afternoons between 2.35pm and 3.50pm. and from 10 December there was a three-minute newsbreak at 3pm.

For the following year, the programme was renamed as Sport on Friday and moved to a Friday afternoon slot, with a slightly extended running time, beginning at either 2.15pm or 2.20pm and running until 3.50pm with a three-minute newsbreak at 3pm, although the programme was sometimes extended until as late as 5.30pm when it was showing extensive live coverage and on those occasions there was a further seven-minute newsbreak at 3.50pm.

Its main live coverage was of snooker, golf, bowls, tennis, skiing, ice skating, and horse racing. Cricket would sometimes be shown notably with highlights of a England overseas tour When not showing live sport the programme would consist of highlights of recent sporting events as well as features and previews of the forthcoming weekend's sporting action. Formula 1 would feature in the sports news section in the form of a short report from Murray Walker of the Friday qualifying sessions.

The programme was initially presented by David Icke until he was replaced by Helen Rollason in 1990.

Regular hosts
David Icke (1986-1990)
Helen Rollason (1990–1997)

References 

BBC Television shows
1980s British sports television series
1990s British sports television series
1987 British television series debuts
1997 British television series endings
BBC Sport